The Knights of Prosperity is an American sitcom that premiered on ABC in the United States on Wednesday, January 3, 2007. It was created by Rob Burnett and Jon Beckerman, who also created the NBC comedy-drama Ed. The show follows a group of misfits—the titular Knights—who attempt to rob various celebrities, the first being Mick Jagger (Jagger was also credited as one of the executive producers, along with the creators and David Letterman). The series was made by Letterman's Worldwide Pants Incorporated and Touchstone Television.

The series initially aired on Wednesdays at 9:00 p.m. before being moved to 8:30. The series was pulled after airing nine episodes and then officially canceled by ABC. On August 8, after 5 months off the air, ABC broadcast two episodes and then pulled the sitcom once again. On August 17, 2007, the network made all 13 episodes available for viewing on ABC.com, but were later taken off.

Name changes and scheduling 

The series went through several name changes: the original title, though never publicly affirmed, was Let's Rob Jeff Goldblum, later changed to Let's Rob Mick Jagger once Goldblum committed to the NBC drama Raines. ABC announced the series for its fall schedule as Let's Rob... in May, and the final name change to Knights of Prosperity was reported in July 2006. During the TCA Tour, executive producer Rob Burnett indicated that the title might change again before the show debuts, but the show debuted under the "Knights" name.

Originally scheduled to debut on October 17, 2006 at 9:00 p.m., it was pulled from the schedule on October 3 in favor of at least two additional 90-minute episodes of its intended lead-in, Dancing with the Stars.  ABC later announced that the program would be shelved and rescheduled for a January 2007 airdate due to the network now making another sitcom, Big Day, a priority for the Tuesday night schedule. On November 9, 2006, ABC began running promos for the show in advance of its January airdate.  On December 5, 2006, ABC announced that the program would premiere on January 3, 2007 at 9:00 p.m.  Although the show was scheduled to air the following week at 9:00, a primetime address by the President of the United States caused the second episode of the show to air at 9:30 p.m.  The show returned to its normal 9:00 time slot the following week. The show was rescheduled to 8:30 beginning on January 31, 2007, and remained there until it was pulled from the schedule on March 5. Before the upfronts, the network announced that it was considering a second season featuring Ray Romano.

However, the show was ultimately canceled, and was briefly brought back in the summer to burn off the remaining episodes along with fellow low-rated newcomer The Nine. Both shows were pulled again on August 14 and on August 17, ABC put up the remaining episodes on its website.

Marketing 
On December 26, 2006, to generate buzz for the show, ABC distributed wallets bearing the monogram "KOP" in a number of markets. The wallets contained a receipt from "Enterprise Luxury Goods Ltd." for millions of dollars in purchases, a claim check for a platinum wristwatch, and an invitation to join a promotional group via text message.

On December 31, 2006 during New Year's Eve in Times Square, ABC also distributed orange acrylic hats bearing a white embroidered "KOP".

Cast and characters

Main cast 
 Donal Logue as Eugene Gurkin
 Sofía Vergara as Esperanza Villalobos
 Lenny Venito as Francis "Squatch" Squacieri
 Maz Jobrani as Gourishankar Subramaniam
 Kevin Michael Richardson as Rockefeller Butts
 Josh Grisetti as Louis Plunk

Guest stars 
 Reiko Aylesworth as Simone Cashwell
 Ben Bailey as Ralph Carnucci
 Dustin Diamond as himself
 Mick Jagger as himself
 Sally Jessy Raphaël as herself
 Kelly Ripa as herself
 Ray Romano as himself
 Rocco DiSpirito as himself

Episodes

International distribution

Seasonal ratings
Seasonal ratings based on average total viewers per episode of Knights of Prosperity on ABC:

References

External links 

 
 Extensive interview with the creators on public radio program The Sound of Young America
 Music from The Knights of Prosperity

American Broadcasting Company original programming
2007 American television series debuts
2007 American television series endings
2000s American single-camera sitcoms
Mick Jagger
English-language television shows
Television series by ABC Studios
Television series by Worldwide Pants
Television shows set in New York City